This article deals with the Caesar (335-337). For the censor Flavius Dalmatius, father of the caesar, see Flavius Dalmatius.  For saints with this name, see Saint Dalmatius (disambiguation).

Flavius Dalmatius Caesar (his name is often spelled Delmatius on contemporary coins; died 337) was a Caesar (335–337) of the Roman Empire, and member of the Constantinian dynasty.

Dalmatius was the nephew of Constantine the Great. His father, also named Flavius Dalmatius, was the half-brother of Constantine and served as censor. Dalmatius and his brother Hannibalianus were educated at Tolosa (Toulouse) by rhetor Exuperius.

On 18 September 335, he was raised to the rank of Caesar by his uncle, with the control of Thracia, Achaea and Macedonia. Dalmatius died in late summer 337, killed by his own soldiers. It is possible that his death was related to the purge that hit the imperial family at the death of Constantine, and organized by Constantius II with the aim of removing any possible claimant to imperial power other than the sons of the late emperor.

See also
Constantinian dynasty

References and sources
References

Sources
 DiMaio, Michael, "Dalmatius Caesar (335-337 A.D)", in DIR
 
 

337 deaths
4th-century murdered monarchs
Constantinian dynasty
Flavii
Year of birth unknown
Caesars (heirs apparent)